Anbe Deivam is a 1957 Indian Tamil-language film directed by R. Nagendra Rao. The film stars him alongside M. K. Radha, K. Sarangapani and Sriranjani Jr.

Plot 

Mohan Rao is a film producer. He lives with his wife. A couple and their child daughter Uma live in the neighbourhood. The husband is a rogue. He plans to rob the film producer. While he is executing his plan he kills someone. His wife takes the blame, but both are imprisoned. Mohan Rao and his wife adopt Uma. Time goes and Uma becomes a young woman. She is in love with a youth who is the son of a police officer. Uma's parents are released and they return home. Her father observes that Uma is living comfortably and that she is going to marry. He tries to blackmail Mohan Rao and get money. Uma's marriage is fixed. On the wedding day her father tries to create problems in order to stop the marriage. How he is exposed and how Uma's wedding takes place forms the rest of the story.

Cast 
The list was adapted from the review article in The Hindu

Male cast
 R. Nagendra Rao
 M. K. Radha
 C. V. V. Panthulu
 K. Sarangapani
 V. Gopalakrishnan
 Ganapathi Bhat
 P. D. Sambandam

Female cast
 Sriranjani Jr.
 N. R. Sandhya
 Sooryakala
 K. S. Angamuthu
 Baby Uma
 T. E. Krishnamachari
 Pottai Krishnamurthi

Dance E. V. Saroja, Thangappan, Ganga, Madhavi

Soundtrack 
The music was composed by H. R. Padmanabha Sastry & Vijaya Bhaskar.  Lyrics were penned by Sundarakannan.

Reception 
Anbe Deivam was released on 6 December 1957. On the same day, The Indian Express called it a "technically flawless picture" and praised the music. Despite this, it was not a success.

References

External links 
 

1950s Tamil-language films
1956 drama films
Films scored by Vijaya Bhaskar
Indian drama films
Films scored by H. R. Padmanabha Sastry